Sameeksha Sud is an Indian television actress and Internet personality. She is best known for the television shows Baal Veer, Doli Armaano Ki and Ek Aastha Aisi Bhee.

Career
Sud started her television career from 2012. She made her acting debut from Fear Files. She received prominence through television show Baal Veer in which she played the character of Pari. She has also worked in Doli Armano Ki and Gumrah.

In 2020, Sud made her OTT debut though web show Who's Your Daddy (season 2) presented by ALTBalaji and ZEE5.

Filmography

Television 

|-
|2018
|Tenali Rama
|Sharda Devi
|}

Web series

Music videos

References

External links

Indian television actresses
Indian web series actresses
Actresses in Hindi television
21st-century Indian actresses
1991 births
Living people